Panorama City is a neighborhood in the city of Los Angeles, California, in the San Fernando Valley. It has a generally young age range as well as the highest population density in the Valley. Ethnically, more than half of its population was born abroad, a higher percentage than Los Angeles as a whole. Known as the valley's first planned community after a transition from agriculture to a post-World War II housing boom, it has produced several notable residents. It is now a mixture of single-family homes and low-rise apartment buildings.

Panorama City has three high schools, two recreational centers, a senior center, two hospitals and a chamber of commerce.

History

Panorama City is known as the San Fernando Valley's first planned community. In 1948, it was developed as such by residential developer Fritz B. Burns and industrialist Henry J. Kaiser. The master plan was created by architectural firm Wurdeman & Becket. Burns, seeing the tremendous potential fortune that could be made as large numbers of World War II veterans came home and started families, teamed up with Kaiser in 1945 to form Kaiser Community Homes. The vast majority of the houses were bought with loans issued by the Federal Housing Administration or the Servicemen's Readjustment Act of 1944, better known as the G.I. Bill.

Homes in the area were sold with racially discriminatory covenants. A "Conditions, Covenants, Restrictions" document filed with the county recorder declared that no Panorama City lot could be "used or occupied by any person whose blood is not entirely that of the white or Caucasian race." Such restrictive covenants, which sometimes also limited ownership to people "of the Christian faith," were then common in many communities at the time. Although rendered legally unenforceable by the Civil Rights Act of 1968, they may still be found on some older property deeds.

De facto integration was accelerated by the Community Reinvestment Act of 1977. The CRA-insured credit was provided to the entire community without regard to race or income, causing white flight as with many other areas of the San Fernando Valley. During the period of desegregation busing, Panorama City was exempted due to its diversity.

Panorama City was once adjacent to General Motors' largest assembly plant to date. Today, the Van Nuys Assembly plant has been replaced with a large shopping center named The Plant, which includes stores and restaurants such as Regency Theatres, Ross, Babies "R" Us, The Home Depot, Hometown Buffet, Blaze Pizza, In-N-Out Burger, Starbucks Coffee and others.

Geography 
Panorama City touches Mission Hills on the north, Arleta on the northeast, Sun Valley on the east, Valley Glen on the southeast, Van Nuys on the south and North Hills on the west.

For the most part, the community is a mixture of small single-family homes and low-rise apartment buildings.

Demographics

The 2010 U.S. census counted 69,817 residents in the neighborhood’s 91402 ZIP code. The median age was 30.1, and the median yearly household income at that time was USD$41,467.

In 2008, the Los Angeles Times Mapping L.A. project described Panorama City as an area that was "moderately diverse" ethnically, with a high percentage of Latinos and a significant population of Filipinos. Filipinos and Mexicans were the most common ancestries in the neighborhood. At that time, the breakdown was Latinos, 70.1%; whites, 11.5%; Asians, 11.9%; blacks, 4.3%; and others, 2.2%.  Mexico (52.1%) and El Salvador (13.4%) were the most common places of birth for the 55.0% of the residents who were born outside of the United States—a high percentage for Los Angeles.

As of the 2010 census, renters were occupying 64.8% of the housing stock, while owners held 35.2%.

There were 2,849 families headed by single parents. The rate of 20.2% was considered to be a high one. There were 1,837 veterans, or 4.3% of the population, a low percentage compared to the rest of the city and county.

Parks and recreation
The Panorama Recreation Center is in the community. The center, which also functions as a Los Angeles Police Department drop-in facility, has an auditorium, a lighted baseball diamond, lighted outdoor basketball courts, a children's play area, a community room, an indoor gymnasium, picnic tables, and unlit tennis courts.

The Sepulveda Recreation Center is located in Panorama City. The center has two indoor gymnasiums, both of which can be used as auditoriums. The center also has a lighted baseball diamond, lighted indoor basketball courts, a children's play area, a community room, and lighted tennis courts. The Sepulveda Pool is an outdoor unheated seasonal pool in the Sepulveda center.

The Mid-Valley Senior Citizen Center is in Panorama City. The center has an auditorium, a kitchen, and a stage. The building was originally a convalescent home. As of July 2000 the former convalescent home was being converted into the senior center.

Government and infrastructure

The Panorama City Neighborhood Council is a city agency formed by volunteer elected officials and appointed officials.
The purpose of the Panorama City Neighborhood Council is to provide an inclusive open forum for public discussion, and to serve as an advisory body on issues of concern to the Panorama City area and in the governance of the city of Los Angeles.
The Council gained its official city role upon certification by the Board Of Neighborhood Commissioners on March 15, 2007.

Metro and LADOT operates fixed-route transit bus service in Panorama City. Metro Rapid line 761 operates on Van Nuys Boulevard. Metro Local lines 152, 158, 166, 167, 169, and 233 operate the community. LADOT operates DASH bus service on their Panorama City/Van Nuys route. In 2027, Metro will open the East San Fernando Valley Transit Corridor light rail project with stations on Van Nuys Boulevard at Nordhoff Street & Roscoe Boulevard.

Representation
California's 29th congressional district
California's 18th State Senate district
California's 46th State Assembly district
Panorama City Chamber of Commerce
Los Angeles City Council District 6
Panorama City Neighborhood Council

Economics
Panorama City was the largest center of major retail outlets in the San Fernando Valley, starting with the opening of what would later become the Panorama Mall in 1955. At the time, this small complex included The Broadway and five other stores. Three other major department stores — Ohrbachs, J. W. Robinson's and Montgomery Ward – opened nearby over the next ten years, and they were marketed collectively as the Panorama City Shopping Center. By the 1970s, the area had lost business to nearby communities.  The freestanding Ohrbach's building, designed by the architectural firm Welton Becket and Associates, is significant in that it represents "an early and important phase of commercial development" in the neighborhood. It is now the site of the Valley Indoor Swap Meet.

The Panorama Mall remains an important local mall, with a Walmart and Curacao discount stores, the latter catering to the Hispanic market.

Education

Thirteen percent of Panorama City residents aged 25 and older had earned a four-year degree by 2000, an average percentage for both the city and the county. The percentage of the same-age residents with less than a high school diploma was high for the county.<ref>Less Than High School Ranking - Mapping L.A. - Los Angeles Times "Less Than High School," Mapping L.A., Los Angeles Times]</ref>

Schools within the Panorama City boundaries are:

Public

 Panorama High School, 8015 Van Nuys Blvd.
 Liggett Street Elementary School, 9373 Moonbeam Avenue
 Primary Academy for Success, elementary, 9075 Willis Avenue
 Valor Academy Charter, middle, 8755 Woodman Avenue
 Panorama City Elementary School, 8600 Kester Avenue
 Chase Street Elementary School, 14041 Chase Street
 Vista Middle School, 15040 Roscoe Boulevard
 Burton Street Elementary School, 8111 Calhoun Avenue
 Cal Burke High School, continuation, 14630 Lanark Street
 Ranchito Avenue Elementary School, 7940 Ranchito Avenue
 Michelle Obama Elementary School, 8150 Cedros Avenue
Alta California Elementary School, 14839 Rayen St

Private

 St. Genevieve Elementary School, 14024 Community Street
 St. Genevieve High School, 13967 Roscoe Boulevard

Healthcare
Kaiser Permanente has a hospital and medical center complex on Woodman Ave. and Roscoe Blvd. serving the central and eastern San Fernando Valley. The complex covers three city blocks as a medical campus first opened in 1963. Mission Community Hospital is a private, for-profit hospital owned by Deanco Healthcare located on Roscoe Blvd. serving the neighborhood.  Mission Community Hospital features a basic adult Emergency Room, surgical services, an inpatient psychiatric hospital, and inpatient medical services.

Notable people

 David Smith, volleyball player and Olympian
 José Benavidez, Professional boxer
 Kirk Cameron, actor, Christian evangelist 
 Candace Cameron Bure, actress 
 Terry Gilliam, Monty Python member and film director
 Meagan Good, actress
 Mark-Paul Gosselaar, actor
 Hopsin, rapper
 Mike Shinoda, musician
 Giancarlo Stanton, Major League Baseball player
 Sara Velas, artist
 Steve Wapnick, baseball player
 Zack Britton Professional Baseball pitcher for the New York Yankees

See also
 Van Nuys Boulevard

References

External links

 Panorama City Chamber of Commerce
 Panorama City Neighborhood Council
 Pacoima/Panorama City - CRA/LA''
 
 Panorama City crime map and statistics 

 
Neighborhoods in Los Angeles
Communities in the San Fernando Valley
1948 establishments in California
Populated places established in 1948